Jeffrey B. Welch (born 1954) is Senior Vice President of Krispy Kreme as well as President of the company's international development. He has been an executive at Krispy Kreme since 2004.

Welch is a graduate of the Marriott School of Management, Brigham Young University.

Husband to Carmen and father to Matthew, David, and Lauren.

External links
Forbes profile of Welch

1954 births
Marriott School of Management alumni
Living people
Place of birth missing (living people)
Date of birth missing (living people)